Maysan Stadium is a multi-use stadium in Amarah, Iraq. The stadium holds 25,000 people and was opened in 1987.

Renovation 

Plans were made to renovate the stadium after 2003, but work began only in 2011. The project included rehabilitating the VIP area, the pitch, installing 25,000 seats, a new running track, a roof over the entire stadium and other facilities within the stadium compound. 

Renovation work soon stopped due to lack of money. Work restarted in 2016, and the stadium was officially re-opened on 22 July 2017, although the roof has not yet been completed.

Tenant

Naft Maysan will most likely play most of their home games at this stadium.

See also 
List of football stadiums in Iraq

References 

Football venues in Iraq
Athletics (track and field) venues in Iraq
Multi-purpose stadiums in Iraq
1987 establishments in Iraq
Sports venues completed in 1987